California Resources Corporation is a company engaged in hydrocarbon exploration in California. It is organized in Delaware and headquartered in Los Angeles. It has the largest privately held mineral acreage position in California.

The company has conventional primary, enhanced oil recovery, and unconventional operations in the San Joaquin Basin, Ventura Basin, and Los Angeles Basin and dry gas production in the Sacramento Basin. Its largest holding is the 47,000-acre Elk Hills Oil Field, 20 miles west of Bakersfield, California in the San Joaquin Valley. It is also operates the Wilmington Oil Field in partnership with California, several smaller fields in Los Angeles County, and the Huntington Beach Oil Field in Orange County, California. As of December 31, 2021, the company had  of estimated proved reserves, of which 71% was petroleum, 20% was natural gas, and 9% was natural gas liquids.

History
The company was formed in April 2014 as a corporate spin-off of Occidental Petroleum. In April 2018, the company acquired the interest in the Elk Hills Oil Field previously held by Chevron Corporation for $460 million and 2.85 million shares. In July 2020, the company filed bankruptcy with $5 billion in debt; it emerged from bankruptcy in October 2020. In March 2021, Mark A. (“Mac”) McFarland was appointed CEO. The company benefited financially from the 2021 Texas power crisis.

References

External links
 

2014 establishments in California
American companies established in 2014
Companies based in Los Angeles
Companies established in 2014
Companies listed on the New York Stock Exchange
Companies that filed for Chapter 11 bankruptcy in 2020
Corporate spin-offs
Energy companies established in 2014
Natural gas companies of the United States
Non-renewable resource companies established in 2014
Oil companies of the United States
Petroleum in California